Michael Grierson Jarrett  (8 January 1934 – 14 November 1994), also commonly known as Mike Jarrett, was a British archaeologist and gay rights activist. Specialising in the archaeology of Roman Britain (particularly around the frontiers), he spent much of his academic career at Cardiff University, where he was awarded a personal chair in 1980. Outside of academia, Jarrett was a prominent member of the Campaign for Homosexual Equality.

Education
Jarrett, a Lancastrian, was educated at Manchester Grammar School and Durham University, where he graduated with a degree in History. He fell under the influence of Eric Birley, and was drawn to the study of Hadrian's Wall. His Ph.D., entitled A Study of the municipal aristocracies of the Roman Empire in the west, with special reference to North Africa, was awarded in 1958. A programme of archaeological excavations soon followed at Halton Chesters and, most notably, Maryport.

Career
Jarrett joined the newly founded Department of Archaeology at University College, Cardiff in 1960 as a lecturer in Roman-British History and Archaeology. Given his background as a 'Wall' archaeologist this might have been expected to be a temporary post before an inevitable return to the North. Instead, Jarrett stayed in Cardiff long term and embarked on a series of ambitious excavations of the Roman forts of Wales. Based on this research, he published in 1969 what is considered his magnum opus, the second edition of The Roman Frontier in Wales, which built on the first edition written by Victor Erle Nash-Williams. During the 1970s his fieldwork energies were split between the deserted medieval village of West Whelpington, near Kirkwhelpington in Northumberland, and the site of the Roman villa at Whitton, South Glamorgan.

Ill health terminated his fieldwork in the 1980s, though he continued contributing to academic journals. Before his death he had become interested in the early architectural history of Durham Cathedral, and his study of its building phases appeared posthumously in The Antiquaries Journal.

At Cardiff he was known for his unusual teaching style. He once delivered a lecture lying on his back on a desk blowing smoke rings, and on a different occasion walked through one door while making a point and returned through another still discussing it.

Personal
In 1976 Jarrett wrote an article for a church magazine objecting to critical comments on homosexuality made by Archbishop of Wales, Gwilym Williams, and suggested that gay clergy were 'not rare'.

He died from liver failure on 14 November 1994, and was survived by his partner Shaun. His obituary in The Times simply noted that he was unmarried.

Publications

Books

 Nash-Williams, V. E., and Michael G. Jarrett. The Roman Frontier in Wales. 2nd ed., University of Wales Press, 1969. 
 Jarrett, Michael Grierson. Maryport, Cumbria: a Roman Fort and Its Garrison. Wilson & Son, 1976.
 Jarrett, Michael G., and Stuart Wrathmell. Whitton: an Iron Age and Roman Farmstead in South Glamorgan. University of Wales Press, 1981.

Articles

 Jarrett, Michael G. “The Career of L. Titinius Clodianus.” Latomus, vol. 21, no. 4, 1962, pp. 853–859. 
 Jarrett, Michael G. “The African Contribution to the Imperial Equestrian Service.” Historia: Zeitschrift Für Alte Geschichte, vol. 12, no. 2, 1963, pp. 209–226. 
 Jarrett, Michael G. “Decurions and Priests.” The American Journal of Philology, vol. 92, no. 4, 1971, pp. 513–538. 
 Jarrett, Michael G. “An Unnecessary War.” Britannia, vol. 7, 1976, pp. 145–151. 
 Jarrett, Michael G., and Stuart Wrathmell. “Sixteenth- and Seventeenth-Century Farmsteads: West Whelpington, Northumberland.” The Agricultural History Review, vol. 25, no. 2, 1977, pp. 108–119. 
 Jarrett, Michael G. “The Case of the Redundant Official.” Britannia, vol. 9, 1978, pp. 289–292. 
 Jarrett, Michael G. “Non-Legionary Troops in Roman Britain: Part One, the Units.” Britannia, vol. 25, 1994, pp. 35–77.

References

1934 births
1994 deaths
Academics of Cardiff University
Alumni of Hatfield College, Durham
English archaeologists
People educated at Manchester Grammar School
English LGBT people
LGBT academics
Fellows of the Society of Antiquaries of London
20th-century LGBT people